Maytenus krukovii is a tree species native to the Amazon rainforest; it grows in Bolivia, Colombia, Ecuador, and Peru.

In the Quechua languages the tree is called chuchuhuasi (alternately spelled chuchuasi) or chuchuhuasha (alternately spelled chucchu huashu, and sometimes shortened to chuchasha). This name in all its permutations means "trembling back", due to the bark's effectiveness in relieving back pain, as well as the discomforts of arthritis and rheumatism. Indigenous peoples of the Amazon drink decoctions and tinctures of the bark as an herbal tonic. Extracts of the bark of M. krukovii are antioxidant and somewhat antimutagenic. A person can chew the bark, but it tastes very bitter.

References

krukovii
Trees of the Amazon
Trees of Bolivia
Trees of Colombia
Trees of Ecuador
Trees of Peru
Medicinal plants of South America